Ladagnous is a French surname. Notable people with the surname include:

Caroline Ladagnous (born 1988), French rugby union player
Mathieu Ladagnous (born 1984), French cyclist

French-language surnames